Mathéo Jacquemoud (born July 17, 1990) is a French ski mountaineer. He is member of the Team Ecrins Hautes-Alpes and member of the French national team of ski mountaineering. He also competes in mountain running.

Selected results 
 2012:
 2nd, European Championship, team, together with Yannick Buffet
 6th, European Championship, combined ranking
 8th, European Championship, individual
 9th, European Championship, vertical race
 5th, Pierra Menta, together with Xavier Gachet
 2013:
 1st, Pierra Menta, together with William Bon Mardion
 2016:
 1st, Pierra Menta, together with Kilian Jornet Burgada

References

External links 
 Mathéo Jacquemoud, skimountaineering.org
 Ranking ISMF events, International Ski Mountaineering Federation

1990 births
Living people
French male ski mountaineers
Sportspeople from Drôme
21st-century French people
20th-century French people